Nigeria was planning to participate at the 2014 Summer Youth Olympics, in Nanjing, China, but on 13 August 2014 they pulled out of the games due to pressure from Chinese Authorities in an attempt to prevent Ebola from West Africa from entering their nation.

Athletics

Nigeria qualified seven athletes.

Qualification Legend: Q=Final A (medal); qB=Final B (non-medal); qC=Final C (non-medal); qD=Final D (non-medal); qE=Final E (non-medal)

Boys
Track & road events

Field Events

Girls
Track & road events

Beach Volleyball

Nigeria qualified a boys' and girls' team by their performance at the CAVB Qualification Tournament.

Wrestling

Nigeria qualified one athlete based on its performance at the 2014 African Cadet Championships.

Girls

References

2014 in Nigerian sport
Nations at the 2014 Summer Youth Olympics
Nigeria at the Youth Olympics